K. Parthiban (Tamil: கே. பார்திபன்) is a Malaysian politician of Indian (specifically Tamil) descent. He is a member of the Malaysian Indian Congress (MIC), a component party of the ruling Barisan Nasional (BN) coalition, and has been the party's Tanjung Karang division secretary since 2002. In 2003, he was appointed as a special officer to the incumbent Tanjung Karang MP, Datuk Noh Omar.

Early life
Parthiban was born in Ladang Raja Musa, Kuala Selangor district, Selangor. He attended the Seri Kota Teachers' Training College in Kuala Lumpur before enrolling in the University of Malaya, from where he graduated with a Bachelor of Science (B.Sc.) degree and later a Master of Education (M.Ed.) in Education Management.

Parthiban was as a teacher from 1994 to 2006 at various schools in Tanjung Karang and Kuala Selangor prior to entering politics.

Politic career
On 16 April 2007, despite being a relative novice in politics, Parthiban was chosen as the BN candidate in the 2007 Ijok by-election. Parthiban eventually defeated Khalid Ibrahim of Parti Keadilan Rakyat (PKR) in a straight fight.

In the 2008 Malaysian general elections, K. Parthiban contested in the N10 Bukit Melawati, Selangor State Legislative Assembly and eventually lost to Muthiah a/l Maria Pillay from PKR by a slim majority of 297 votes.

Election results

Notes and references 

Living people
Malaysian politicians of Indian descent
Malaysian Hindus
Malaysian people of Tamil descent
Year of birth missing (living people)
People from Selangor
Members of the Selangor State Legislative Assembly
Malaysian Indian Congress politicians